There are several battles known as the Battle of the Dunes:
 The Battle of the Dunes (1600) was a battle of the Eighty Years' War fought near Nieuwpoort in the Spanish Netherlands between the Dutch army of Maurice of Nassau and the Spanish army of Archduke Alberto
 The Battle of the Dunes (1658) was a battle of the Franco-Spanish War and Anglo-Spanish War fought near Dunkirk in the Spanish Netherlands between the Spanish army and the allied armies of France and the Commonwealth of England